Molla-Mustafa Jami Mosque is located in Bakhchisaray, Crimea, built approx. in the 18th century by a Khan of the Crimean Khanate.

The mosque is mentioned in documents of the Taurida Governorate from 1890, concerning the state of its roof in 1888. Correspondence between construction bureaus of the governorate alleges that there might have been a maktab school housed in the mosque.

The mosque is a listed local heritage object. After renovations, the mosque was reopened in January 2012.

See also
Religion in Crimea
Islam in Russia
List of mosques in Russia
List of mosques in Europe

References

Mosques in Bakhchysarai
Cultural heritage monuments of regional significance in Crimea